Michaelnbach is a municipality in the district of Grieskirchen in the Austrian state of Upper Austria.

Geography
Michaelnbach lies in the Hausruckviertel. About 10 percent of the municipality is forest, and 82 percent is farmland.

References

Cities and towns in Grieskirchen District